Aksanov (masculine) or Aksanova (feminine) is a Russian surname, a variant of Aksyonov. Notable people with the surname include:
Sultan Aksanov (b. 1993), Russian association football player

See also
Aksanovo, a rural locality (a village) in Mozhaysky District of Moscow Oblast, Russia

References

Notes

Sources
И. М. Ганжина (I. M. Ganzhina). "Словарь современных русских фамилий" (Dictionary of Modern Russian Last Names). Москва, 2001. 



Russian-language surnames